Wallerstein may refer to:
 Wallerstein, Bavaria, a town and castle near Nördlingen in Germany
 Codex Wallerstein, a 15th-century fechtbuch named for the Oettingen-Wallerstein library it once was part of.

People
 House of Oettingen-Wallerstein, a cadet branch of the House of Oettingen-Oettingen created in 1423 and 1557
 Adelaide Wallerstein (1869–1942), American translator, medical doctor, lawyer and clubwoman
 Anton Wallerstein (1813–1892), German composer
 Immanuel Wallerstein (1930–2019), U.S. sociologist
 Jim Wallerstein (born 1968), guitarist and vocalist
 Judith Wallerstein, (1921–2012), psychologist
 Michael Wallerstein (1951–2006), political scientist
 Robert S. Wallerstein, (1921–2014), psychoanalyst

See also
Wallenstein (disambiguation)
Walerstein, a surname